Joseph Manu is a New Zealand professional rugby league footballer who plays as a er or  for the Sydney Roosters in the NRL, and New Zealand at international level.

Manu was a member of the 2018 and 2019 NRL Grand Final championship Roosters rosters.

Background
Manu was born in Hamilton, New Zealand, and is of Māori and Cook Island descent.He was raised in Tokoroa.

Manu played his junior rugby league for Tokoroa High School before being signed by the Sydney Roosters.

Playing career

Early career
Having won the S. G. Ball Cup with the Roosters in 2014, Manu travelled to Glasgow to represent Australia in an under-19s rugby league nines tournament at the 2014 Commonwealth Games, where Australia finished in second place. Manu moved into the Roosters' NYC team by the end of the year, where he played until 2016, scoring 34 tries in 48 games. On 2 May 2015, Manu played for the Junior Kiwis against the Junior Kangaroos, playing on the wing and scoring a try in the 22-20 loss at Robina Stadium. On 16 June 2015, Manu re-signed with the Roosters on a 2-year contract. On 14 September 2015, Manu was named on the wing in the 2015 NYC team of the year as he scored 22 tries in 24 matches for the year.

2016
In February 2016, Manu was selected in the Roosters 2016 NRL Auckland Nines squad. 

In Round 15 of the 2016 NRL season, Manu made his NRL debut for the Sydney Roosters against the New Zealand Warriors, playing on the wing in the 12-10 loss at Mt Smart Stadium.  On 5 September 2016, Manu was named on the wing in the 2016 NYC Team of the Year. On 2 October 2016, Manu played on the wing in the Roosters 2016 Holden Cup Grand Final against the Penrith Panthers, scoring 2 tries in the comeback 30-28 victory after being down 28-6 at halftime. On 11 October 2016, Manu extended his contract with the Roosters to the end of the 2018 season. Manu finished his debut season in the NRL playing in 3 matches for the Roosters in the 2016 NRL season.

2017
In February 2017, Manu was selected in the Roosters 2017 NRL Auckland Nines winning squad.

In Round 7 against the Newcastle Knights, Manu scored his first NRL career try in the Roosters 24-6 win at Hunter Stadium. Manu finished the 2017 NRL season with playing in 16 matches and scoring 5 tries. Manu was overlooked for the Roosters finals series and played for the Wyong Roos in which they made the 2017 NSW Cup against the Penrith Panthers but lost 20-12 at Leichhardt Oval.

2018
On 20 March 2018, Manu extended his contract with the Roosters to the end of the 2020 season. On 30 September 2018, Manu played in the 2018 NRL Grand Final against the Melbourne Storm, playing at centre and scoring a try in the 21-6 win. In the final minutes of the match, Manu was on the receiving end of a kick to the head while he was on the ground by Melbourne five-eighth Cameron Munster in which Munster sin binned for the second time in the match. Manu had an enjoyable 2018 NRL season, playing in 26 matches and scoring 8 tries. The day after the Grand Final win, Manu was selected in the New Zealand national rugby league team 23-man squad for their one-off test against Australia and their tour of England. 

On 13 October 2018, Manu made his international debut for New Zealand against Australia, playing at centre and scoring a try in a sensational debut as the Kiwis pulled off a 26-24 win at Mt Smart Stadium.

2019
Manu made 25 appearances for the Sydney Roosters in the 2019 NRL season as the club finished second on the table and qualified for the finals.  

Manu played at centre in the club's 2019 NRL Grand Final victory over the Canberra Raiders at ANZ Stadium.

2020
On 22 February, Manu played for the Sydney Roosters in their 2020 World Club Challenge victory defeating St Helens 20-12.

Manu played 21 games for the Sydney Roosters in the 2020 NRL season.  The club finished fourth on the table and qualified for the finals but lost both games to be eliminated in straight sets ending their quest for a third straight premiership.

2021
In round 12 of the 2021 NRL season, he scored two tries in a 44-16 victory over Canberra.

In the round 24 match against arch-rivals South Sydney, former teammate Latrell Mitchell hit Manu with a high and late shot to the head, resulting in a season-ending depressed cheekbone fracture.  The Sydney Roosters would go on to lose the match 54-12.
On 29 November 2021 after a speculated move to the  New Zealand Warriors, Manu extended his contract to start with the Sydney Roosters until the end of 2024.

2022
In round 4 of the 2022 NRL season, he scored two tries for the Sydney Roosters in a 28-4 victory over North Queensland.  The following week, he scored a further two tries in a 24-20 victory over Brisbane.  In round 18, Manu scored two tries in a 54-26 victory over St. George Illawarra.

In October he was named in the New Zealand squad for the 2021 Rugby League World Cup.

In November he was named in the 2021 RLWC Team of the Tournament and was named the winner of the Golden Boot, for the best international player of the year.

2023
In round 3 of the 2023 NRL season, Manu was sent to the sin bin during the Sydney Roosters 20-18 victory over arch-rivals South Sydney.

References

External links

Sydney Roosters profile
Roosters profile
NRL profile

1996 births
Living people
New Zealand national rugby league team  players
New Zealand rugby league players
New Zealand Māori rugby league players
New Zealand sportspeople of Cook Island descent
Sydney Roosters players
Junior Kiwis players
Wyong Roos players
Rugby league wingers
Rugby league centres
Rugby league players from Hamilton, New Zealand
People educated at Tokoroa High School